Ijinasi or Naejinjuji (內珍朱智) was the founder and first ruler of Daegaya.

Name
The name Ijinasi and Naejinjuji appears in Samguk Sagi.

Legends about his birth
There are two legends about his birth.

Fall from the sky and born from an egg
According to a legend recorded in the Samguk Yusa written in the 13th century, in the year 42 CE, six eggs descended from heaven with a message that they would be kings. Six boys were born, and within 12 days they grew mature. One of them, named Suro, became the king of Geumgwan Gaya, and the other five founded the remaining five Gayas, namely Daegaya, Seongsan Gaya, Ara Gaya, Goryeong Gaya, and Sogaya.

The son of Junggyeonmoju
According to Joseon dynasty geography book Shinjeungdonggukyeojiseungram (新增東國輿地勝覽), a local goddess called Jeonggyeonmoju (正見母主) gave birth to Ijinasi and King Suro after being influenced by sky god Ibiga (夷毗訶)

Notes

References

Gaya rulers